Te Hoiere may refer to:

Te Hoiere (waka), a voyaging canoe used in the migrations that settled New Zealand.
Maud Island, an island in the Marlborough Sounds, New Zealand, with the alternative official name Te Hoiere.
Pelorus River, a river in Marlborough, New Zealand, officially called Te Hoiere / Pelorus River.
Pelorus Sound / Te Hoiere, a drowned valley in the Marlborough Sounds, New Zealand.